The ISU World Team Trophy in Figure Skating is a figure skating team competition sanctioned by the International Skating Union. The World Team Trophy was held for the first time in Tokyo, Japan from April 16 to 19, 2009. Traditionally, the competitive skating season had concluded with the World Championships.

The new event was announced at a news conference during the 2008 World Championships, in the hope of encouraging countries to develop top figure skaters in all disciplines. Each country sends two men, two ladies, one pair and one ice dancing entry.

Competition and participants

Selected skaters from the six countries with the best results during the season compete in the disciplines of men's singles, ladies singles, pair skating, and ice dancing in a team format. The participating countries in the inaugural event were (in descending order of finish) the US, Canada, Japan, France, Russia and China. The Japan Skating Federation paid the global prize money for the ISU World Team Trophy in 2009. The total prize money in 2009 was US$1,000,000, the highest ever in an ISU event, with $200,000 awarded to the winning country. In 2015, the qualifying countries (in descending order of qualification) were Russia, the United States, Japan, Canada, France and China, with the United States taking the title. Prize money was once again US$1,000,000.

Reactions

In 2009, there were reports that some of the participating skaters did not wish to take part in the event. Canadian ice dancer Scott Moir was quoted as saying that although the event was fun, skaters had been pressured to attend. U.S. ice dancer Tanith Belbin told an interviewer that she and partner Benjamin Agosto had not been aware of the event until after the 2009 World Championships. Evan Lysacek, who had won the World Championship shortly before the World Team Trophy, was quoted in the same article as saying he was excited and looking forward to competing in Japan as part of the American team, referring to the event as "icing on the cake".

In 2012, skaters expressed more enthusiasm about competing at the World Team Trophy. Daisuke Takahashi referred to the competition as "a lot of fun", while Scott Moir said it was turning into an exciting event, especially considering a team event would be contested at the 2014 Winter Olympics. The fact that this event is held after all major competitions forced many athletes not attending for not risking injuries or fatigue after a long season. The event is also not in a similar format as the Olympics: Ice dance and Pair events only count as two events each and individual competitions for four events, thus favoring teams and nations who are not well fulfilled in Ice dance and Pair events. The lowest ranked ice dancers and pairs are also awarded at least 7 pts, marginalizing the points difference toward the winners who are awarded only 4 more points for a maximum of 12 pts.

Team standings

Medal table

References

External links
 2009 ISU results
 2012 ISU results

ISU World Team Trophy
World Team Trophy